The yellow-billed tit-tyrant (Anairetes flavirostris) is a species of bird in the family Tyrannidae. It is found in Argentina, Bolivia, Chile, and Peru.

Its natural habitats are subtropical or tropical moist montane forests and subtropical or tropical high-altitude shrubland.

Taxonomy
The yellow-billed tit-tyrant's genus, Anairetes, is believed to be most closely related to the genera Mecocerculus and Serpophaga; however, there is no definitive evidence supporting this claim. Members of the genus Anairetes are known commonly as tit-tyrants because their active foraging behavior and crests are reminiscent of the true tits in the family Paridae.

References

Cited texts
 

yellow-billed tit-tyrant
Birds of the Puna grassland
Birds of Argentina
yellow-billed tit-tyrant
yellow-billed tit-tyrant
yellow-billed tit-tyrant
Taxonomy articles created by Polbot